The St. Thomas Moraine is an east-west glacial moraine considered one of the Horseshoe Moraines. It formed at the time of Lake Maumee II filled part of the basin of what is now Lake Erie. Other portions of the basin were filled by a lobe of the Laurentian icesheet, known as the Erie Lobe.

References

Moraines of Ontario